Smiths Creek is a  long 2nd order tributary to the Deep River in Lee County, North Carolina.

Variant names
According to the Geographic Names Information System, it has also been known historically as: 
Smith Creek

Course
Smiths Creek rises about 1 mile southwest of Ebenezer Church in Lee County, North Carolina and then flows north to join the Deep River about 1.5 miles southwest of Gulf, North Carolina.

Watershed
Smiths Creek drains  of area, receives about 47.7 in/year of precipitation, and has a wetness index of 384.73 and is about 76% forested.

References

Rivers of North Carolina
Rivers of Lee County, North Carolina